Huntingdon is a constituency west of Cambridge in Cambridgeshire and including its namesake town of Huntingdon. It has been represented in the House of Commons of the UK Parliament since 2001 by Jonathan Djanogly of the Conservative Party.

Huntingdon is a safe Conservative seat and was the seat of former Conservative Prime Minister, John Major.

First established around the time of the Model Parliament in 1295, Huntingdon was the seat of Oliver Cromwell in 1628–29 and 1640–1642.

History
The constituency of Huntingdon has existed in three separate forms: as a parliamentary borough from 1295 to 1885; as a division of a parliamentary county from 1885 to 1918; and as a county constituency from 1983 until the present day.

Representatives for the seat, the standard two burgesses per parliamentary borough, were summoned to form the first fully assembled parliament, the Model Parliament in 1295 and at all parliaments assembled from then until 1868, in which year the constituency was reduced to a single-member borough in accordance with the Reform Act 1867. In the mid-17th century, this was Oliver Cromwell's constituency.

Under the Redistribution of Seats Act 1885, the parliamentary borough was abolished altogether and the two-member parliamentary county of Huntingdonshire was replaced by the two-single member seats formally known as the Northern or Ramsey Division and the Southern or Huntingdon Division. It was abolished under the Representation of the People Act 1918 when it was re-combined with Ramsey and Huntingdonshire was re-established as a single member constituency.

As a result of the Local Government Act 1972, the two counties of Cambridgeshire and Isle of Ely, and Huntingdon and Peterborough were merged to form the non-metropolitan county of Cambridgeshire, with effect from 1 April 1974. However, the next redistribution did not come into effect until the 1983 general election, when the majority of the Huntingdonshire constituency, including Huntingdon, Godmanchester, Ramsey and St Ives, was formed into the new County Constituency of Huntingdon. Areas to the south of Peterborough, which were now part of the expanded City of Peterborough, were included the Borough Constituency of Peterborough and southernmost areas, including St Neots, were included in the new County Constituency of South West Cambridgeshire. The re-established constituency also included rural areas to the west of Peterborough, including Barnack and Werrington.

There were significant boundary changes at the 1997 general election, when the neighbouring seat of North West Cambridgeshire was created from areas previously in the seats of Huntingdon and Peterborough.

The former Conservative Prime Minister (1990–1997) John Major represented the seat from its re-creation in 1983 until his retirement in 2001.  His majority in 1992 (36,230) was the largest majority for any member of parliament post-1832 until 2017, in which George Howarth won a 42,214 vote majority in Knowsley.

Boundaries and boundary changes 

1832–1885: The townships of Huntingdon and Godmanchester.

1885–1918: The Sessional Divisions of Leightonstone and Toseland, incorporating the towns of Huntingdon, Godmanchester, and St Neots.

1983–1997: The District of Huntingdon wards of Brampton, Bury, Earith, Ellington, Elton, Farcet, Fenstanton, Godmanchester, Hemingford Abbots and Hilton, Hemingford Grey, Houghton and Wyton, Huntingdon North, Huntingdon West, Kimbolton, Needingworth, Ramsey, Sawtry, Somersham, Stilton, St Ives North, St Ives South, The Stukeleys, Upwood and The Raveleys, Warboys, and Yaxley, and the City of Peterborough wards of Barnack, Glinton, Northborough, Werrington, and Wittering.

1997–2010: The District of Huntingdonshire wards of Brampton, Buckden, Eaton Ford, Eaton Socon, Ellington, Eynesbury, Fenstanton, Godmanchester, Gransden, Hemingford Abbots and Hilton, Hemingford Grey, Houghton and Wyton, Huntingdon North, Huntingdon West, Kimbolton, Needingworth, Paxton, Priory Park, St Ives North, St Ives South, Staughton, The Offords, and The Stukeleys.

Gained the parts of the District of Huntingdon, including St Neots, which had previously been part of the abolished South West Cambridgeshire constituency. The City of Peterborough ward of Werrington was transferred to the Peterborough constituency.  Remaining Peterborough wards and northern parts of the District of Huntingdon, including Ramsey, were included in the new County Constituency of North West Cambridgeshire.

2010–present: The District of Huntingdonshire wards of Alconbury and The Stukeleys, Brampton, Buckden, Fenstanton, Godmanchester, Gransden and The Offords, Huntingdon East, Huntingdon North, Huntingdon West, Kimbolton and Staughton, Little Paxton, St Ives East, St Ives South, St Ives West, St Neots Eaton Ford, St Neots Eaton Socon, St Neots Eynesbury, St Neots Priory Park, and The Hemingfords.

Local authority wards revised. Further minor loss to North West Cambridgeshire.

The constituency consists of the towns of St Neots, Huntingdon, St Ives, Godmanchester and a number of smaller settlements in Western Cambridgeshire.

Members of Parliament

MPs c1290–1660

MPs 1660–1868

MPs 1868–1918

MPs since 1983

Elections

Elections in the 2010s

Elections in the 2000s

Elections in the 1990s 
:

The constituency underwent boundary changes prior to the 1997 election and the changes are not based on the 1992 result.

:

Elections in the 1980s 
:

:

Elections in the 1910s

Elections in the 1900s

Elections in the 1890s

Elections in the 1880s 

 Caused by Montagu's succession to the peerage, becoming Earl of Sandwich.

Elections in the 1870s

 Caused by Karslake's resignation.

 Caused by Karslake's appointment as Attorney General for England and Wales.

 Caused by Baring's death.

Elections in the 1860s

Seat reduced to one member

 Caused by Peel's appointment as Secretary of State for War

Elections in the 1850s

 Caused by Peel's appointment as Secretary of State for War.

Elections in the 1840s

 Caused by Pollock's resignation upon his appointment as Chief Justice of the Court of the Exchequer

 Caused by Peel's appointment as Surveyor-General of the Ordnance and Pollock's appointment as Attorney General for England and Wales

Elections in the 1830s

Wells and Sweeting were put forward as candidates, and received "a show of hands of ten to one" against Calvert and Stuart, who had received seven and five respectively. However, the mayor declared Stuart and Calvert as having the majority of legal votes and the seat was not put to a poll.

See also 
 List of parliamentary constituencies in Cambridgeshire
 North West Cambridgeshire (UK Parliament constituency)

Notes

References

Parliamentary constituencies in Cambridgeshire
Constituencies of the Parliament of the United Kingdom disestablished in 1918
Constituencies of the Parliament of the United Kingdom established in 1983
Constituencies of the Parliament of the United Kingdom represented by a sitting Prime Minister
Politics of Huntingdonshire
John Major